Butta Bomma is a 2023 Indian Telugu-language romantic action thriller film directed by Shouree Chandrashekhar T. Ramesh in his directorial debut and produced by Sithara Entertainments and Fortune Four Cinemas. It is a remake of the 2020 Malayalam film, Kappela. It stars Anikha Surendran, Arjun Das and Surya Vashistta. The title is inspired by the song of the same name from Ala Vaikunthapurramuloo (2020).

Cast 
Anikha Surendran as Satya 
Arjun Das as Ramakrishna aka RK
Surya Vashistta as Murali
Navya Swamy as Vasundhara, RK’s love interest
Raj Tirandasu
Jagadeesh Prathap Bandari

Soundtrack 

The music is composed by Gopi Sundar and Sweekar Agasthi while the latter did the film score.The audio rights were acquired by Aditya Music.The first single " Vinodamlo Kathemundo" was released on 9 January 2023.The second single "Ammadi Gummadi" was released on 2 February 2023.The full album was released by Aditya Music on 10 February 2023.

Reception 
A critic from The Times of India wrote that "The beautiful locale, tasty cinematography, and impressive performances make it a decent watch, even for those who watched the Malayalam original". A critic from The New Indian Express wrote that "Director Shouree Chandrasekhar T Ramesh makes inspired tweaks and nativized additions, resulting in a decent remake". A critic from Telugucinema.com wrote that "Butta Bomma is a well-crafted film about a social issue, but it is not as effective as the original Malayalam film". A critic from 123Telugu wrote that "On the whole, Butta Bomma is a slow but passable drama that has a key social message".

References 

2023 films
Indian romantic action films
Indian action drama films
2020s Telugu-language films
Films set in Andhra Pradesh
Films shot in Andhra Pradesh
2023 action drama films
2023 romantic drama films
Telugu remakes of Malayalam films
Films scored by Gopi Sundar
2023 directorial debut films